Kate Bliss and the Ticker Tape Kid is a 1978 American made-for-television comedy Western film. It was written by William Bowers and directed by Burt Kennedy.

Cast
Suzanne Pleshette as Kate Bliss
Don Meredith as Clint Allison
Harry Morgan as Hugo Peavey
David Huddleston as Sheriff
Tony Randall as Lord Seymour Devery
Burgess Meredith as William Blackstone
Buck Taylor as Joe
Jerry Hardin as Bud Dozier
Gene Evans as Fred Williker
Harry Carey Jr. as Deputy Luke
Alice Hirson as Beth Dozier 
Don Collier as Tim 
Don 'Red' Barry as Devery's Foreman
Richard Herd as Donovan

Reception
The Los Angeles Times called it "pure bliss".

References

External links

Kate Bliss and the Ticker Tape Kid at TCMDB
Kate Bliss and the Ticker Tape Kid at BFI

1978 television films
1978 films
1970s Western (genre) comedy films
ABC network original films
American comedy television films
American Western (genre) comedy films
Films directed by Burt Kennedy
1970s English-language films
1970s American films
American Western (genre) television films